Gwendolyn Margaret MacEwen (1 September 1941 – 29 November 1987) was a Canadian poet and novelist. A "sophisticated, wide-ranging and thoughtful writer," she published more than 20 books in her life. "A sense of magic and mystery from her own interests in the Gnostics, Ancient Egypt and magic itself, and from her wonderment at life and death, makes her writing unique.... She's still regarded by most as one of the best Canadian poets."

Life 
MacEwen was born in Toronto, Ontario. Her mother, Elsie, spent much of her life as a patient in mental health institutions. Her father, Alick, suffered from alcoholism. Gwendolyn MacEwen grew up in the High Park area of the city, and attended Western Technical-Commercial School.

MacEwan's first poem was published in The Canadian Forum when she was only 17, and she left school at 18 to pursue a writing career. By 18 she had written her first novel, Julian the Magician.

"She was small (5'4") and slight, with a round pale face, huge blue eyes usually rimmed in kohl (Egyptian eye shadow), and long dark straight hair."

Her first book of poetry, The Drunken Clock, was published in 1961 in Toronto,. then the centre of a literary revival in Canada, encouraged by the editor Robert Weaver and influential teacher Northrop Frye. MacEwen was thus in touch with James Reaney, Margaret Atwood, Dennis Lee, etc. She married poet Milton Acorn, 19 years her senior, in 1962, although they divorced two years later.

She published over twenty books, in a variety of genres. She also wrote numerous radio docudramas for the Canadian Broadcasting Corporation (CBC), including a "much-admired radio drama", Terror and Erebus, in 1965 which featured music by Terry Rusling.

With her second husband, Greek musician Niko Tsingos, MacEwen opened a Toronto coffeehouse, The Trojan Horse, in 1972. She and Tsingos translated some of the poetry of contemporary Greek writer Yiannis Ritsos (published in her 1981 book Trojan Women).

She taught herself to read Hebrew, Arabic, Greek, and French, and translated writers from each of those languages. In 1978 her translation of Euripides' drama The Trojan Women was first performed in Toronto.

She served as writer in residence at the University of Western Ontario in 1985, and the University of Toronto in 1986 and 1987.

During the last years of her life she was in a relationship with street writer Crad Kilodney (Lou Trifon).

MacEwen died in 1987, at the age of 46, of health problems related to alcoholism. She is buried in Toronto's Mount Pleasant Cemetery.

Writing

"A sophisticated, wide-ranging and thoughtful writer," says The Canadian Encyclopedia, MacEwen "displayed a commanding interest in magic and history as well as an elaborate and penetrating dexterity in her versecraft."

Her two novels – Julian the Magician, dealing with the ambiguous relationship between the hermetic philosophies of the early Renaissance and Christianity; and King of Egypt, King of Dreams, which imaginatively reconstructed the life and religious reformation of Egyptian pharaoh Akhenaton – blend fantasy and history.

Recognition
MacEwen won the Governor General's Award in 1969 for her poetry collection The Shadow Maker. She was awarded a second Governor General's Award posthumously in 1987 for Afterworlds.

Other awards and prizes MacEwen won include the CBC New Canadian Writing Contest for poetry in 1965; the A.J.M. Smith Poetry Award in 1973; the Borestone Mountain Poetry Award in 1983; the CBC Literary Competition, for short story in 1983; and the Du Maurier Awards, gold and silver for poetry, in 1983.

Her writing has been translated into many languages including Chinese, French, German, and Italian.

Rosemary Sullivan published a biography of MacEwen, Shadow Maker: The Life of Gwendolyn MacEwen, in 1995, which itself won the Governor General's Award, for non-fiction in 1995.

Fictional tributes to MacEwen have been published by Margaret Atwood (the short story "Isis in Darkness"), and Lorne S. Jones (the novel Mighty Oaks).

A one-woman play by Linda Griffiths, Alien Creature: A Visitation from Gwendolyn MacEwen, won the Dora Mavor Moore Award and the Chalmers Award in 2000.

A documentary film by Brenda Longfellow, Shadow Maker: Gwendolyn MacEwen, Poet, was made in 1998 and won the Genie Award for Best Short Documentary.

Gwendolyn MacEwen Park

The former Walmer Road Park, in The Annex neighbourhood of Toronto, was renamed Gwendolyn MacEwen Park in her honor in 1994.

On 9 September 2006, a bronze bust of MacEwen by her friend, sculptor John McCombe Reynolds, was unveiled in the park.

The park had been a grassy traffic circle in the middle of Walmer Road at Lowther Avenue, but a $300,000 makeover in 2010, expanded the park and narrowed the surrounding roads. The unique redesigned greenspace reopened 21 July 2010, and writer Claudia Dey read one of MacEwen's poems.

Publications

Poetry
 Selah. Toronto: Aleph Press, 1961.
 The Drunken Clock. Toronto: Aleph Press, 1961.
 The Rising Fire. Toronto: Contact Press, 1963.
 Terror and Erebus (1965)
 A Breakfast for Barbarians. Toronto: Ryerson Press, 1966.
 The Shadow-Maker. Toronto: Macmillan, 1969.
 The Armies of the Moon . Toronto: Macmillan, 1972. 
 Magic Animals: Selected Poems Old and New. Toronto: Macmillan, 1974. 
 Trojan Women, 1981.
 The Fire-Eaters. Ottawa: Oberon Press, 1982. 
 The T. E. Lawrence Poems. Oakville: Mosaic Press, 1982.
 Earth-Light: Selected Poetry 1963-1982. Toronto: General Publishing, 1982. 
 The Man with Three Violins 1986 HMS Press (Toronto) 
 Afterworlds. Toronto: McClelland and Stewart, 1987. 
 Atwood, Margaret and Barry Callaghan, eds. The Poetry of Gwendolyn MacEwen: The Early Years (Volume One). Toronto: Exile Editions, 1993. 
 Atwood, Margaret and Barry Callaghan, eds. The Poetry of Gwendolyn MacEwen: The Later Years (Volume Two). Toronto: Exile Editions, 1993.

Fiction
 
 
 Noman. Ottawa: Oberon Press, 1972.
 Noman's Land: stories Coach House Press, 1985.

Non-fiction
 Mermaids and Ikons: A Greek Summer. Toronto: House of Anansi, 1978.

Children's books
 The Chocolate Moose. Toronto: N/C Press, 1979. 
 The Honey Drum. Oakville: Mosaic Press, 1983. 
 Dragon Sandwiches Black Moss Press, 1987.

Drama
Trojan Women after the play by Euripides (includes poems Helen and Oristos by Yannis Ritsos, translated by MacEwen and Niko Tsingos). Toronto: Exile Editions. 2009 [1994, 1981]. 978-1-55096-123-2
The Birds after the play by Aristophanes. Toronto: Exile Editions. 1993 [1983]. 978-1-55096-065-5

Except where noted, bibliographic information courtesy of Brock University.

Discography
Open Secret. CBC Learning Systems, 1972. LP T-57191
Celebration: Famous Canadian Poets CD Canadian Poetry Association – 2001    (CD#3) ( with Raymond Souster )

See also

Canadian literature
Canadian poetry
List of Canadian poets

References

Books
 Jan Bartley. Invocations: the poetry and prose of Gwendolyn MacEwen. 1983.
 Mª Luz González-Rodríguez. Bajo el Signo del Dios Mercurio: dicotomía del ser y fusión de los opuestos en Gwendolyn MacEwen. Ph. Thesis. Departamento de Filología Inglesa y Alemana, Universidad de La Laguna,2003, . http://riull.ull.es/xmlui/handle/915/9951  
 Rosemary Sullivan. Shadow Maker: The Life of Gwendolyn MacEwen. Toronto: Harper Collins, 1995.
 Linda Weiland: «Unravelling». C.G. Jungs Individuations- und Archetypenlehre im Werk Gwendolyn MacEwens. Peter Lang, Berne 2013  (In German)

Articles
 Atwood, Margaret. "MacEwen's Muse." Canadian Literature 45 (1970): 24–32.
 Barrett, Elizabeth. "A Tour de Force." Evidence 8 (1964): 140–143.
 Davey, Frank. "Gwendolyn MacEwen: The Secret of Alchemy." Open Letter (second series) 4 (1973): 5–23.
 Di Michele, Mary. "Gwendolyn MacEwen: 1941-1987." Books in Canada 17.1 (1988): 6.
 Eso, David. "Perfect Mismatch: Gwendolyn MacEwen and the Flat Earth Society." Studies in Canadian Literature 44.2 (2019): 211–231.
 Gerry, Thomas M. "Green Yet Free of Seasons: Gwendolyn MacEwen and the Mystical Tradition of Canadian Poetry." Studies in Canadian Literature 16.2 (1991/1992): 147–161.
 Gillam, Robyn. "The Gaze of a Stranger: Gwendolyn MacEwen's Hieratic Eye." Paragraph 13.2 (1991): 10–13.
 Godfrey, Dave. "Figments of a Northern Mind." Tamarack Review 31 (1964): 90–91.
 González-Rodríguez, Mª Luz. "Caronte y la Luna: arquetipos míticos en The Armies of the Moon de Gwendolyn MacEwen." Revista Canaria de Estudios Ingleses 48 (2004): 179–192.
 González-Rodríguez, Mª Luz. "El camino arquetípico del héroe: el Mago y el Sumo Sacerdote en las novelas de Gwendolyn MacEwen." Revista Canaria de Estudios Ingleses 39 (1999): 307–321.
 González-Rodríguez, Mª Luz. "The Presence of Science in Gwendolyn MacEwen's Cosmic Vision: An Ephemeral Creation of Order out of Chaos." Exchanges between Literature and Science from the 1800s to the 2000s. Converging Realms. Cambridge Scholars Publishing, 2017, pp. 90–103. .    
 Gose, E.B. "They Shall Have Arcana." Canadian Literature 21 (1964): 36–45.
 Harding Russell, Gillian. "Gwendolyn MacEwen's 'The Nine Arcana of the Kings' as Creative Myth and Paradigm." English Studies in Canada 15.2 (1988): 204–217.
 Harding Russell, Gillian. "Iconic Mythopoeia in MacEwen's The T.E. Lawrence Poems." Studies in Canadian Literature 9.1 (1984): 95–107.
 Helwig, Maggie. "The Shadowmaker Confirmed the Poet in Me." Catholic New Times 21.19 (1997): 13,14.
 Jones, D.G. "Language of Our Time." Canadian Literature 29 (1966): 67–69.
 Kelly, M. T. "Thoughts From a Friend (Profile of Gwendolyn MacEwen)." Canadian Woman Studies 9.2 (1988): 89.
 Kemp, Penn. "A Musing I Would Like to have Shared with Gwendolyn MacEwen." Tessera 5 (1988): 49–57.
 "MacEwen Possessed a Talent that was Fragile, Precocious." Globe and Mail (Metro Edition) 2 December 1987: A10, C5.
 Marshall, Joyce. "Remembering Gwendolyn MacEwen." Brick 45 (1993): 61–65.
 Marshall, Tom. "Several Takes on Gwendolyn MacEwen." Quarry 38.1 (1989): 76–83.
 "Obituary: Author." Gwendolyn MacEwen. Quill and Quire 54.3 (1988): 62.
 Potvin, Elisabeth. "Gwendolyn MacEwen and Female Spiritual Desire." Canadian Poetry 28 (1991): 18–39.
 Purdy, Al. "Death in the Family." Saturday Night 103.5 (1988): 65–66.
 Ringrose, Christopher. "Vision Enveloped in Night." Canadian Literature 53 (1972): 102–104.
 Sowton, Ian. "To Improvise an Eden." Edge 2 (1964): 119–124.
 Tsingos, Nikolas. "Poems for Gwendolyn MacEwen." Descant 24.4 (1993/ 1994): 41.
 Warwick, Ellen D. "To Seek a Single Symmetry." Canadian Literature 71 (1976): 21–34.
 Wilkinson, Shelagh. "Gwendolyn MacEwen's Trojan Women: Old Myth into New Life." Canadian Woman Studies 8.3 (1987): 81–83.
 Wood, Brent. "From The Rising Fire to Afterworlds: The Visionary Circle in the Poetry of Gwendolyn MacEwen." Canadian Poetry 47 (2000): 40–69.

Notes

External links 
 

 
 Dark Pines (TV Movie)
 Canadian Poetry Online: Gwendolyn MacEwen - Biography and 7 poems (Let Me Make This Perfectly Clear, Fragments from A Childhood, Magic Cats, Poems in Braille, Memoirs of a Mad Cook, The Drunken Clock, Dark Pines Under Water)
 
 
 

1941 births
1987 deaths
20th-century Canadian poets
Canadian women novelists
Canadian people of Scottish descent
Canadian women poets
Governor General's Award-winning poets
Writers from Toronto
University of Toronto people
20th-century Canadian novelists
20th-century Canadian women writers